Harlington Upper School (HUS) is a rural, coeducational upper school and sixth form with academy status in Harlington, Bedfordshire, England.

History
The school was established in 1973.
In 2007 a house-based approach to student support was developed which includes "vertical" tutor groups, meaning that form groups have a mix of ages which encourages students to have stronger relationships with other members of the school, not exclusively their own year.

In 2017, the school removed the vertical tutoring system but decided to keep the current houses. After removing this system, there are only eight schools nationally that still use the vertical tutor system.

Students 
The majority of students join Harlington from three Bedfordshire middle schools: Arnold, Parkfields and Robert Bloomfield. The students mainly live in the villages near Harlington including: Harlington, Toddington, Harlington Mill, Sharpenhoe, Barton-le-Clay, Silsoe, Clophill, Westoning, Pulloxhill, Greenfield, Maulden, Ampthill, Flitwick, Luton, Chalton, and Streatley.

Most students join the school in year 9, aged 13. They start their GCSE courses in year 9 and take the GCSE exams in years 10 and 11, aged 15 or 16. Some students choose to continue attending the school following their GCSEs and join a large sixth form of over 420.

Notable alumni 
Notable recent alumni include actress Emily Atack, rugby player Josh Bassett and political commentator Leon Emirali.

Houses 
As of September 2007, the forms are not sorted by year group (age) but rather there are six houses each with 10 forms. The houses are named after Greek mythical creatures and gods, Apollo, Europa, Hercules, Midas, Pegasus, Theseus. The forms are named after the letters from HARLINGTON other than the repeated N which is replaced by the U from Upper. The name of an individual form is the initial letter of the house and the initial letter of HARLINGTOU, for example the first form in Pegasus would be PH then PA, PR etc. With the new house structure, there are a number of responsibility positions available for students to fill, e.g. House captain, and editor of the house newspaper.

Apollo (yellow)
Europa (blue)
Hercules (red)
Midas (gold/orange)
Pegasus (purple)
Theseus (green)

New buildings 
Between October 2003 and April 2006, the school underwent a major building and refurbishment programme as part of the Mid-Bedfordshire PFI scheme.

In November 2006, the Mid-Bedfordshire PFI scheme was officially opened by the Queen during a visit to Bedfordshire at neighbouring Samuel Whitbread Upper School.

Science College and Academy 
In September 2006 the school gained specialist Science College status. The school continues to teach the full range of National Curriculum subjects, but uses its strength and expertise in Science and Mathematics to support other schools and the local community. The school has also been selected by the DfES and the Specialist Schools Trust to become a Deep Support Hub for the Eastern Region.

On 1 March 2012, Harlington Upper School officially became an academy.

External links 
Official school website

References 

Upper schools in Central Bedfordshire District
Academies in Central Bedfordshire District
Educational institutions established in 1973
1973 establishments in England